Bangladesh has submitted films for the Academy Award for Best International Feature Film since 2002. The award is handed out annually by the United States Academy of Motion Picture Arts and Sciences to a feature-length motion picture produced outside the United States that contains primarily non-English dialogue. It was not created until the 1956 Academy Awards, in which a competitive Academy Award of Merit, known as the Best Foreign Language Film Award, was created for non-English speaking films, and has been given annually since. Seventeen Bangladeshi films have been submitted for the Academy Award for Best Foreign Language Film, but none of them have been nominated for an Oscar.

In addition to the seventeen films officially submitted by Bangladesh, Pakistan submitted The Day Shall Dawn for Oscar consideration in 1959. Dawn was filmed in Bangladesh (then East Pakistan) with a mostly Bangladeshi cast speaking Urdu, the official language of West Pakistan.

Submissions
The Academy of Motion Picture Arts and Sciences has invited the film industries of various countries to submit their best film for the Academy Award for Best Foreign Language Film since 1956. The Foreign Language Film Award Committee oversees the process and reviews all the submitted films. Following this, they vote via secret ballot to determine the five nominees for the award. Below is a list of the films that have been submitted by Bangladesh for review by the Academy for the award by year and the respective Academy Awards ceremony.

The Bangladeshi nominee is decided annually by the Bangladesh Federation of Film Societies. All Bangladeshi submissions were filmed in Bengali.

All but one of the Bangladeshi submissions since 2005 have been produced by Impress Telefilm Limited film studio, based in the capital Dhaka, and there was a lot of cast crossover between the films. Actors Fazlur Rahman Babu, Jayanta Chattopadhyay and Shahidul Islam Sachchu, as well as actress Rokeya Prachi each had leading roles in three out of the six submitted films, including Britter Baire in which all four co-starred.

See also
 List of Academy Award-winning foreign language films
 List of Academy Award winners and nominees for Best International Feature Film
 List of countries by number of Academy Awards for Best International Feature Film
 Cinema of Bangladesh
 Dhallywood

Notes

References

External links
 The Official Academy Awards Database
 The Motion Picture Credits Database
 IMDb Academy Awards Page

Best Foreign Language Film Academy Award submissions by country
Academy Award for Best Foreign Language Film, submissions for